Giambattista Nolli (or Giovanni Battista) [April 9, 1701 – July 3, 1756], was an Italian architect and surveyor. He is best known for his ichnographic plan of Rome, the Pianta Grande di Roma which he began surveying in 1736 and engraved in 1748, and now universally known as the Nolli Map. It was produced and published in response to the commission of Pope Benedict XIV to survey Rome in order to help create demarcations for the 14 traditional rioni or districts. It was by far the most accurate description of Rome produced to date at a time when the architectural achievement of the Papacy was in full flower.

Biography
Born in 1701 in Castiglione d'Intelvi (Como), he moved to Rome thanks to the patronage of members of the patrician Albani and Corsini families.

As an architect, he worked on the churches of Sant'Alessio on the Aventine Hill (1743) and Santa Dorotea in Trastevere (1751–1756).

Nolli Map
The Nolli map reflects Bufalini's map of 1551,  with which Nolli readily invited comparison, however Nolli made a number of important innovations. Firstly, Nolli reorients the city from east (which was conventional at the time) to magnetic north, reflecting Nolli's reliance on the compass to get a bearing on the city's topography. Secondly, though he follows Bufalini in using a figure-ground representation of built space with blocks and buildings shaded in a dark poché, Nolli represents enclosed public spaces such as the colonnades in St. Peter's Square and the Pantheon as open civic spaces. Finally, the map was a significant improvement in accuracy, even noting the asymmetry of the Spanish Steps.  The map was used in government planning for the city of Rome until the 1970s; it was used as a base map for all Roman mapping and planning up to that date.

The map is framed with a vedute by Stefano Pozzi.  A scaled-down edition, a collaboration between Nolli and Giovanni Battista Piranesi, was published in the same year the original map was finished.  Piranesi was instrumental in getting the work printed; Giuseppe Vasi also contributed.

See also
Turgot map of Paris

Notes

References

There have been a number of facsimile editions of the Nolli Map, two are listed here:
'The New Plan of Rome' By James Tice and Erik Steiner, University of Oregon Press, USA, 2006.
'The Nolli Plan of Rome: Facsimile', Full-size facsimile portfolio of the original 19 sheets 56 cm x 81 cm [22"x 32"] with 12pp intro. by Allen Ceen; J. H. Aronson Publisher,  Highmount, NY 12441, 1st Ed. 1984, 2nd Ed. 1991.

External links

 The interactive Nolli Map, by B-Open Solutions / Roma Leggendaria
 Nolli - Navigate Rome in 1748 the Nolli Map for iOS
 a website dedicated to the Nolli map

1701 births
1756 deaths
18th-century Italian architects
Cartography by city
People from Como